The Mother of Kings is a 1982 Polish drama film, directed by Janusz Zaorski. It was immediately banned by the Polish Communist regime - having depicted that regime as baselessly hounding and persecuting a loyal and devoted party member. The film only received a proper release in 1987. It was entered into the 38th Berlin International Film Festival, where it won the Silver Bear for an outstanding single achievement.

Plot
The early part of the film takes place in 1930's Poland. Lucja Krol, a working-class woman, loses her husband who was run over by a tram. Soon afterwards she gives birth to her fourth son, alone on the floor in her apartment. Lucja's neighbor Wiktor who is a Communist intellectual, tries to help the poverty-stricken Lucja and her children, but is arrested and imprisoned by Poland's pre-war right-wing regime. Then come the dark years of the German occupation. At the black market, Lucja narrowly avoids a Nazi roundup. Lucja sons turn to Communism and hold ardent meetings in their apartment, with their mother's blessing. Lucja goes on working hard, and without complaining. After the war, the Communists take power in Poland - but rather than being rewarded for his loyal service, the son Klemens is inexplicably arrested, and without any foundation the new regime accuses him of having been a collaborator. His brother Wiktor, who now holds a senior position in the Communist Party, tries to defend him - but then himself falls into disgrace. Klemens undergoes torture in order to extract a false "confession" but dies in prison, a Communist to the end. His mother Lucja is never told about what happened to him.

Cast
 Magda Teresa Wójcik as Lucja Król
 Zbigniew Zapasiewicz as Wiktor Lewen
 Franciszek Pieczka as Cyga
 Bogusław Linda as Klemens Król
 Adam Ferency as Zenon Król
 Michal Juszczakiewicz as Stas Król
 Krzysztof Zaleski as Roman Król
 Joanna Szczepkowska as Marta Stecka / Stecka-Król
 Zbigniew Zamachowski
 Henryk Bista as Grzegorz Wiechra
 Zbigniew Bielski as Kogut
 Tadeusz Huk as Renard
 Jerzy Trela as Hiszpan
 Stanislaw Kwaskowski as Dentysta

References

External links

1987 films
1980s Polish-language films
1987 drama films
Films directed by Janusz Zaorski
Polish drama films